Muarabulian is the capital of Batang Hari Regency in the Jambi Province of Sumatra, Indonesia.

Nearby towns and villages include Jebak (10.8 nm), Terusan (5.1 nm), Palayangan (3.6 nm), Muarasingoan (4.1 nm), Betung(9.1 nm) and Bejubang(6.4 nm).

Climate
Muarabulian has a tropical rainforest climate (Af) with moderate rainfall in June and July and heavy rainfall in the remaining months.

References

External links
Satellite map at Maplandia.com

Populated places in Jambi
Regency seats of Jambi